Ronald Muldrow (February 2, 1949 in Chicago – January 31, 2007 in Los Angeles) was a soul jazz and hard bop jazz guitarist.

As an emerging jazz guitarist in the early 1970s, Muldrow connected with soul-jazz saxophonist Eddie Harris and contributed to many of his Atlantic albums from 1971 to 1976 and reunited with the saxophonist on Listen Here (1982).

A teenage Muldrow heard jazz guitarist Wes Montgomery play "Canadian Sunset" on the radio and was captivated.  His first big-time gig was with the Staple Singers, a gospel group. 
He also taught at various colleges and had published guitar-instruction books. Muldrow  began forming bands in high school and earned a bachelor's in jazz studies from Roosevelt University in Illinois and a master's in studio and jazz guitar from the  USC Thornton School of Music.

Musician Georgia Anne Muldrow is his daughter.

Discography

As leader 
 Yesterdays (Enja, 1993)
 Diaspora (Enja, 1995)
 Facing Wes (Kokopelli, 1996)
 Freedom's Serenade (Double-Time, 1999)
 Mapenzi (Joh-Bev Records, 2003)

As sideman 
With Eddie Harris
 Instant Death (Atlantic, 1972)
 Eddie Harris Sings the Blues (Atlantic, 1972)
 Excursions (Atlantic, 1973)
 Is It In (Atlantic, 1974)
 Bad Luck Is All I Have (Atlantic, 1975)
 I Need Some Money (Atlantic, 1975)
 That Is Why You're Overweight (Atlantic, 1975)
 The Reason Why I'm Talking S--t (Atlantic, 1976)
 How Can You Live Like That? (Atlantic, 1977)
 Listen Here! (Enja, 1993)

With others
 Les DeMerle, Concerts by the Sea (Bar T, 1978)
 Les DeMerle, Transcendental Watusi! (United National, 1979)
 Hubert Laws, Family (Columbia, 1980)
 Phil Perry, My Book of Love (Private Music, 2000)
 Sweet Baby J'ai, Evolution (Sunset Music, 2002)
 Luther Thomas, Yo' Momma (Moers, 1981)

References

External links
 Official site

1949 births
2007 deaths
Guitarists from Chicago
USC Thornton School of Music alumni
California State Polytechnic University, Pomona alumni
California State Polytechnic University, Pomona faculty
Roosevelt University alumni
American jazz guitarists
Hard bop guitarists
Soul-jazz guitarists
20th-century American guitarists
Jazz musicians from Illinois
Double-Time Records artists
Enja Records artists